Tứ Lộc is a former district of Hải Hưng province in South Vietnam. It was formed on February 24, 1979, from the merger of the Tứ Kỳ and Gia Lộc districts.

References 

Former districts of Vietnam